Phaeochrous emarginatus, is a species of scavenger scarab beetle found in India, Sri Lanka, Bhutan, China, Taiwan, Japan, Laos, Myanmar, Thailand, Malaysia, Vietnam, Indonesia, Philippines, New Guinea, Ryukyu Archipelago, and Australia.

Description
There are slight differences among the subspecies. Nominate subspecies has elytral punctation which is not so strongly irregular. Typical length is about 8.2 to 13.7 mm. There are 5 to 25 denticles in fore tibia and slightly heterogeneous 5th, 9th and 13th interstriae. The irregular punctation are widely extended. Parameral excavation is well defined whereas the upper margin of blade is gently curved. Apex more or less curved downward.

The subspecies buruensis is about 8.1 to 9.5 mm in length. There are 6 to 11 denticles in fore tibia and regularly punctate striae in elytra. The 5th, 9th and 13th interstriae are approximately slightly heterogeneous. The subspecies benderitteri is about 10.1 to 15 mm in length, and there are 11 to 18 denticles in fore tibia. The subspecies suturalis is very small with a length of about 7.8 mm. It has 17 denticles in fore tibia. The subspecies suturalis is 8.7 to 10.2 mm in length. There are 11 to 15 denticles in fore tibia and striai punctation and heterogeneous 5th, 9th and 13th interstriae.

Subspecies
Seven subspecies have been identified.

 Phaeochrous emarginatus benderitteri Pic, 1928
 Phaeochrous emarginatus buruensis Kuijten, 1978
 Phaeochrous emarginatus cyclops Prokofiev, 2012
 Phaeochrous emarginatus davidis Fairmaire, 1886
 Phaeochrous emarginatus emarginatus Castelnau, 1840
 Phaeochrous emarginatus suturalis Lansberge, 1885
 Phaeochrous emarginatus thilliezi Keith, 1999

References 

Scarabaeiformia
Insects of Sri Lanka
Insects of India
Insects described in 1840